M118 may refer to:

M-118 (Michigan highway), a state highway
Mercedes-Benz M118 engine, an automobile engine
7.62×51mm NATO, a rifle cartridge called M118
Mark 118 bomb, an American general purpose bomb
M118, a US military semi trailer